Snizhne or Snezhnoye (until 1864 — Vasylivka — ) is a city in Horlivka Raion, Donetsk Oblast, Ukraine. The eastern edge of Snizhne is adjacent to administrative border of Luhansk Oblast. Its population is

History
The settlement was established in 1784 as a "winter place" Vasylivka (Vasilyevka) by Don Cossacks and was part of the Taganrog city municipality. In 1864 it was renamed as Snizhne/Snezhnoye which literally means Snowy.

During the 2014 pro-Russian unrest in Ukraine the town was held by separatists.
On July 15, 2014, rockets from an unidentified aircraft struck the town hitting an apartment building and a tax office, leaving at least eleven people dead and eight injured.
Separatists blamed the Ukrainian Air Force for the attack, but Ukrainian sources denied it and stated that since the incident where an An-26 plane was shot down on July 14, 2014, they have carried out no flights there. Instead they blamed Russian jets.

After the downing of Malaysia Airlines Flight 17 on July 17, 2014, a YouTube video and photo emerged with citizen journalists claiming the material was from Snizhne and showed a Buk missile launcher.

Fighting for the control of the town between the separatists and the Ukrainian army broke out on 28 July 2014. Snizhne remained under the effective control of the  self-proclaimed Donetsk People's Republic.

Demographics 
As of the 2001 Ukrainian Census, reported ethnicity and language preferences were:

Ethnicity
 Ukrainians: 51.3%
 Russians: 41%
 Belarusians: 1.0%
 Tatars: 0.9%
 Armenians: 0.2%
 Greeks: 0.2%

Language
Russian: 84.1%
Ukrainian: 14.8%
Armenian: 0.1%
Belarusian: 0.1%

Economy
 Snizhneantratsyt
 Snizhne Engineering Factory (a branch of Motor Sich)
 Snizhnianskkhimmash, a factory of chemical engineering
 Sofyino-Brodska train station

Gallery

References

External link

 
Cities in Donetsk Oblast
Cities of regional significance in Ukraine
Populated places established in the Russian Empire
Horlivka Raion